Panel may refer to:

Arts and media

Visual arts 
Panel (comics), a single image in a comic book, comic strip or cartoon; also, a comic strip containing one such image
Panel painting, in art, either one element of a multi-element piece of art, such as a triptych, a piece of sequential art such as a graphic novel or comic strip, or a wooden panel used to paint a picture on
Groupings of rock art, pictographs or petroglyphs

Television 
The Panel (Australian TV series), an Australian talk show
The Panel (Irish TV series), an Irish talk show
 Panel game, a form of game show involving a group of celebrities

Law 
 Judicial panel, set of judges who sit to hear a cause of action
 Jury panel, body of people convened to render a judicial verdict
 Panel, or pannel, in Scotland, formal term in solemn proceedings for an accused person; see Indictment

People 
Brice Panel (born 1983), French sprinter
Caroline Giron-Panel (born 1979), French historian and musicologist

Science and technology

Electrical devices 
Breaker panel, a flat area containing electrical circuit breakers
Control panel (engineering), a flat area containing controls and indicators, used to operate machinery
Flat panel display, in (for example) laptops and mobile devices
Solar panel, a flat module of photovoltaic solar cells
Panel switch, a type of electromechanical telephone switching system developed by the Bell System in the 1920s

Other physical objects 
Several types of planar structural elements
Structural insulated panel, a building construction system 
Panelling, a form of wall covering used for decoration and (originally) insulation
Panel edge staining, build-up on aluminium or stainless steel paneling 
Panels, sections of fabric or other material that make up a parachute canopy

Research protocols 
Survey panel, a type of non-random sample survey
Panel study or longitudinal study, a research design involving repeated observations over time
Panel data or longitudinal data, measured over time

Software 
 Panel (computer software), a widget or a control element
 Control panel (software), an interface based by metaphor on a physical control panel
 GNOME Panel, a taskbar implementation for the GNOME desktop environment

Other uses in science and technology
Test panel, a predetermined group of medical tests

Other uses
 Panel discussion, a small group of experts speaking in turns before an audience, usually including a question period and usually with the purpose of educating or persuading

See also 
 Panel van, or Panel truck, forms of solid van or truck, usually smaller than standard models